Andrea Lee (born 1953) is an American-born author of novels and memoirs. Her stories are often international in setting and explore questions of racial and national identity.

Early life
Andrea Lee was born in Philadelphia, Pennsylvania in 1953, as the youngest of three children in a middle-class family; her father was a Baptist minister and her mother was an elementary school teacher. Lee was educated at the private Baldwin School in Bryn Mawr.

After earning a bachelor's degree and a master's degree in English from Harvard University's Radcliffe College, Lee lived in Russia for a year (1978–79) with her first husband. She kept a diary of observations of the people and culture, and drew from that for her first book, a memoir titled Russian Journal (1981). It was nominated for a National Book Award.

Career
After returning to the United States, Lee worked for several years as a staff writer on The New Yorker. She is now a contract writer for the magazine. She has also been published in The New York Times Magazine, The New York Times Book Review, Vogue, Time, The Oxford American, as well as the textbook Elements of Literature.

Her short stories have  been anthologized, including "Winter Barley" in The Best American Short Stories 1993, "Brothers and Sisters Around the World" in The Best American Short Stories 2001, and "Anthropology" in The New Granta Book of the American Short Story (2007, edited by Richard Ford).

Her first novel, Sarah Phillips, was published in 1984. It has semi-autobiographical elements, featuring an African-American woman from Philadelphia who marries a white man met at Harvard, and travels with him to Russia.

Her collection of short stories, Interesting Women: Stories (2001), featured African-American women abroad, especially in Italy. She has explored points of view of educated young women from privileged backgrounds, negotiating European societies and questions of race and class.

Her novel Lost Hearts in Italy: A Novel (2006), also featured Americans in Europe.

Personal life
Since 1992 Lee has lived in Torino, Italy. She is married to an Italian man and they have two children.

Selected works
 Russian Journal, 1981 (nominated for a National Book Award for Nonfiction)
 Sarah Phillips (novel) 1984
 Interesting Women: Stories, 2002 (translated into Italian and published in Italy)
 Lost Hearts in Italy: A Novel, 2006
 "Anthropology" (short story), 2002
 
 Red Island House: A Novel, 2021

References

External links 
 "Andrea Lee",  Penguin Random House.
 

Living people
Harvard University alumni
Novelists from Pennsylvania
20th-century American women writers
American memoirists
African-American non-fiction writers
American women memoirists
The Baldwin School alumni
20th-century American novelists
21st-century American novelists
1953 births
The New Yorker people
American women short story writers
20th-century American non-fiction writers
21st-century American non-fiction writers
21st-century American women writers
African-American novelists
20th-century African-American women writers
20th-century African-American writers
21st-century African-American women
21st-century African-American people